Ira, George and Joe is an album by jazz guitarist Joe Pass that was released in 1982. It was re-issued in 1994 on CD by Original Jazz Classics. It is a tribute album to the songs of George Gershwin and Ira Gershwin.

The photo on the front cover was created by Phil Stern. There is also another version of this cover from 1982 that contains the text "Joe Pass Loves Gershwin" instead of just "Joe Pass".

Reception 

Writing for Allmusic, music critic Scott Yanow wrote of the album "The melodies are quite familiar ("Bidin' My Time" is the closest one to an obscurity), and few surprises occur, but the music swings and the results are quite enjoyable."

Track listing

Personnel 
 Joe Pass – guitar
 John Pisano – guitar
 Jim Hughart – double bass
 Shelly Manne – drums

References 

1981 albums
Joe Pass albums
Albums produced by Norman Granz
George and Ira Gershwin tribute albums
Pablo Records albums